Oleksii PetrovYch Bilyi was a Head of the Mariupol Iron & Steel Works (until 2006). He is a member of the Ukrainian parliament (since November 2007), and a member of the  Economic Policy Committee (since December 2007).

Biography
Oleksii Bilyi was born on 1 May 1961 in the village of Kamyanka, Apostolove Raion, Dnipropetrovsk Oblast, Ukrainian SSR, Soviet Union. Family: wife Irina (b. 1971) a teacher at Donetsk National University; two sons, Oleksandr (b. 1998) and Arseniy (b. 2003), daughter Amelia (b.2003).

Education
Dnipropetrovsk Metallurgical Institute (1988), with a major in "Chemical technology of fuel," Donetsk National University (2001), majoring in Business Economics. From 1979 - 1981 he served in the Soviet Army.

Career
 1981-1988 – worked as a fitter, site supervisor, senior master, and Deputy Chief of coke workshop at Kryvyi Rih coke plant.
 1988-1990 – Chief of the coke workshop, Chief engineer.
 1990-1996 — Director of the Yenakiieve coke plant.
 1996-1998 – Chairman of the management board, JSC "Yenakiieve Coke Plant," Head of the plant.
 1998-2000 – Chairman of the management board, JSC "Yenakiieve Metallurgical Plant".
 2000-2002 – Deputy Chairman of Donetsk State Regional Administration on primary industries and energy.
 2002-2006 – CEO of Mariupol Iron & Steel Works.

In November 2007, Oleksii was elected to the Verkhovna Rada with the Party of Regions, No.33 in the list.
 Chairman of the Subcommittee on government policy on the consumption of waste and scrap iron, Verkhovna Rada committee on economic policy.
 Member of the Permanent Delegation of the Parliamentary Assembly of GUAM.

In the 2014 Ukrainian parliamentary election, he was re-elected into parliament; this time being placed 5th on the electoral list of the Opposition Bloc.

Awards
 Order of Merit, III class (2011), for personal contribution to nation-building, long-term legislative and political activity.
 Merited Worker of Industry of Ukraine (title) (2003).
 Medal "10 Years of Independence of Ukraine" (2001).
 "Miner's Glory" badge, III class (2002).

See also
2007 Ukrainian parliamentary election
List of Ukrainian Parliament Members 2007
Verkhovna Rada

References

External links 
  Aleksey Bely' profile at Verkhovna Rada of Ukraine official web-site

Living people
1961 births
People from Dnipropetrovsk Oblast
Party of Regions politicians
Recipients of the Order of Merit (Ukraine), 3rd class
Eighth convocation members of the Verkhovna Rada
Opposition Bloc politicians